The Foucault pendulum or Foucault's pendulum is a simple device named after French physicist Léon Foucault, conceived as an experiment to demonstrate the Earth's rotation. A long and heavy pendulum suspended from the high roof above a circular area was monitored over an extended time period, showing that the plane of oscillation rotated.

The pendulum was introduced in 1851 and was the first experiment to give simple, direct evidence of the Earth's rotation. Foucault pendulums today are popular displays in science museums and universities.

Original Foucault pendulum

The first public exhibition of a Foucault pendulum took place in February 1851 in the Meridian of the Paris Observatory. A few weeks later, Foucault made his most famous pendulum when he suspended a  brass-coated lead bob with a  wire from the dome of the Panthéon, Paris.

Focault explained his results in an 1851 paper entitled Physical demonstration of the Earth's rotational movement by means of the pendulum, published in the Weekly reports of the sessions of the Academy of Sciences. He wrote that:
...an oscillatory movement of the pendulum mass follows an arc of a circle whose plane is well known, and to which the inertia of matter ensures an unchanging position in space. If these oscillations continue for a certain time, the movement of the earth, which continues to rotate from west to east, will become sensitive in contrast to the immobility of the oscillation plane whose trace on the ground will seem animated by a movement consistent with the apparent movement of the celestial sphere; and if the oscillations could be perpetuated for twenty-four hours, the trace of their plane would then execute an entire revolution around the vertical projection of the point of suspension.

The original bob used in 1851 at the Panthéon was moved in 1855 to the Conservatoire des Arts et Métiers in Paris. A second temporary installation was made for the 50th anniversary in 1902.

During museum reconstruction in the 1990s, the original pendulum was temporarily displayed at the Panthéon (1995), but was later returned to the Musée des Arts et Métiers before it reopened in 2000. On April 6, 2010, the cable suspending the bob in the Musée des Arts et Métiers snapped, causing irreparable damage to the pendulum bob and to the marble flooring of the museum. The original, now damaged pendulum bob is displayed in a separate case adjacent to the current pendulum display.

An exact copy of the original pendulum has been operating under the dome of the Panthéon, Paris since 1995.

Explanation of mechanics

At either the Geographic North Pole or Geographic South Pole, the plane of oscillation of a pendulum remains fixed relative to the distant masses of the universe while Earth rotates underneath it, taking one sidereal day to complete a rotation. So, relative to Earth, the plane of oscillation of a pendulum at the North Pole – viewed from above – undergoes a full clockwise rotation during one day; a pendulum at the South Pole rotates counterclockwise.

When a Foucault pendulum is suspended at the equator, the plane of oscillation remains fixed relative to Earth. At other latitudes, the plane of oscillation precesses relative to Earth, but more slowly than at the pole; the angular speed,  (measured in clockwise degrees per sidereal day), is proportional to the sine of the latitude, :

where latitudes north and south of the equator are defined as positive and negative, respectively. A "pendulum day" is the time needed for the plane of a freely suspended Foucault pendulum to complete an apparent rotation about the local vertical. This is one sidereal day divided by the sine of the latitude. For example, a Foucault pendulum at 30° south latitude, viewed from above by an earthbound observer, rotates counterclockwise 360° in two days.  

Using enough wire length, the described circle can be wide enough that the tangential displacement along the measuring circle of between two oscillations can be visible by eye, rendering the Foucault pendulum a spectacular experiment: for example, the original Foucault pendulum in Panthéon moves circularly, with a 6-metre pendulum amplitude, by about 5 mm each period.  

A Foucault pendulum requires care to set up because imprecise construction can cause additional veering which masks the terrestrial effect. As observed by later Nobel laureate Heike Kamerlingh Onnes, who developed a fuller theory of the Foucault pendulum for his doctoral thesis (1879), geometrical imperfection of the system or elasticity of the support wire may cause an interference between two horizontal modes of oscillation, which caused Onnes' pendulum to go over from linear to elliptic oscillation in an hour. The initial launch of the pendulum is also critical; the traditional way to do this is to use a flame to burn through a thread which temporarily holds the bob in its starting position, thus avoiding unwanted sideways motion (see a detail of the launch at the 50th anniversary in 1902).

Notably, veering of a pendulum was observed already in 1661 by Vincenzo Viviani, a disciple of Galileo, but there is no evidence that he connected the effect with the Earth's rotation; rather, he regarded it as a nuisance in his study that should be overcome with suspending the bob on two ropes instead of one.

Air resistance damps the oscillation, so some Foucault pendulums in museums incorporate an electromagnetic or other drive to keep the bob swinging; others are restarted regularly, sometimes with a launching ceremony as an added attraction. Besides air resistance (the use of a heavy symmetrical bob is to reduce friction forces, mainly air resistance by a symmetrical and aerodynamic bob) the other main engineering problem in creating a 1-meter Foucault pendulum nowadays is said to be ensuring there is no preferred direction of swing.

Precession as a form of parallel transport

In a near-inertial frame moving in tandem with the Earth, but not sharing the rotation of the Earth about its own axis, the suspension point of the pendulum traces out a circular path during one sidereal day.

At the latitude of Paris, 48 degrees 51 minutes north, a full precession cycle takes just under 32 hours, so after one sidereal day, when the Earth is back in the same orientation as one sidereal day before, the oscillation plane has turned by just over 270 degrees. If the plane of swing was north–south at the outset, it is east–west one sidereal day later.

This also implies that there has been exchange of momentum; the Earth and the pendulum bob have exchanged momentum. The Earth is so much more massive than the pendulum bob that the Earth's change of momentum is unnoticeable. Nonetheless, since the pendulum bob's plane of swing has shifted, the conservation laws imply that an exchange must have occurred.

Rather than tracking the change of momentum, the precession of the oscillation plane can efficiently be described as a case of parallel transport. For that, it can be demonstrated, by composing the infinitesimal rotations, that the precession rate is proportional to the projection of the angular velocity of Earth onto the normal direction to Earth, which implies that the trace of the plane of oscillation will undergo parallel transport. When analyzing earthbound motions, the Earth frame is not an inertial frame, but rotates about the local vertical at an effective rate of  radians per day. A simple method employing parallel transport within cones tangent to the Earth's surface can be used to describe the rotation angle of the swing plane of Foucault's pendulum.

From the perspective of an Earth-bound coordinate system (the measuring circle and spectator are Earth-bounded, also if terrain reaction to Coriolis force is not perceived by spectator when he moves), using a rectangular coordinate system with its -axis pointing east and its -axis pointing north, the precession of the pendulum is due to the Coriolis force (other fictitious forces as gravity and centrifugal force have not direct precession component, Euler's force is low because Earth's rotation speed is nearly constant). Consider a planar pendulum with constant natural frequency  in the small angle approximation. There are two forces acting on the pendulum bob: the restoring force provided by gravity and the wire, and the Coriolis force (the centrifugal force, opposed to the gravitational restoring force, can be neglected). The Coriolis force at latitude  is horizontal in the small angle approximation and is given by

The restoring force, in the small-angle approximation and neglecting centrifugal force, is given by

Using Newton's laws of motion this leads to the system of equations

Switching to complex coordinates , the equations read

To first order in  this equation has the solution

If time is measured in days, then  and the pendulum rotates by an angle of  during one day.

Related physical systems

Many physical systems precess in a similar manner to a Foucault pendulum. As early as 1836, the Scottish mathematician Edward Sang contrived and explained the precession of a spinning top. In 1851, Charles Wheatstone described an apparatus that consists of a vibrating spring that is mounted on top of a disk so that it makes a fixed angle  with the disk. The spring is struck so that it oscillates in a plane. When the disk is turned, the plane of oscillation changes just like the one of a Foucault pendulum at latitude .

Similarly, consider a nonspinning, perfectly balanced bicycle wheel mounted on a disk so that its axis of rotation makes an angle  with the disk.

Foucault-like precession is observed in a virtual system wherein a massless particle is constrained to remain on a rotating plane that is inclined with respect to the axis of rotation.

Spin of a relativistic particle moving in a circular orbit precesses similar to the swing plane of Foucault pendulum. The relativistic velocity space in Minkowski spacetime can be treated as a sphere S3 in 4-dimensional Euclidean space with imaginary radius and imaginary timelike coordinate. Parallel transport of polarization vectors along such sphere gives rise to Thomas precession, which is analogous to the rotation of the swing plane of Foucault pendulum due to parallel transport along a sphere S2 in 3-dimensional Euclidean space.

In physics, the evolution of such systems is determined by geometric phases. Mathematically they are understood through parallel transport.

Foucault pendulums around the world

There are numerous Foucault pendulums at universities, science museums, and the like throughout the world. The United Nations General Assembly Building at the United Nations headquarters in New York City has one. There used to be much longer pendulums, such as the  pendulum in Saint Isaac's Cathedral, Saint Petersburg, Russia.

South Pole
The experiment has also been carried out at the South Pole, where it was assumed that the rotation of the Earth would have maximum effect. A pendulum was installed in a six-story staircase of a new station under construction at the Amundsen-Scott South Pole Station. The location was ideal: no moving air could disturb the pendulum. The researchers confirmed about 24 hours as the rotation period of the plane of oscillation.

See also

Absolute rotation
Coriolis effect
Earth's rotation
Eötvös experiment
Inertial frame
Lariat chain
Precession

References

Further reading

External links

 Wolfe, Joe, "A derivation of the precession of the Foucault pendulum".
 "The Foucault Pendulum", derivation of the precession in polar coordinates.
 "The Foucault Pendulum" By Joe Wolfe, with film clip and animations.
 "Foucault's Pendulum" by Jens-Peer Kuska with Jeff Bryant, Wolfram Demonstrations Project: a computer model of the pendulum allowing manipulation of pendulum frequency, Earth rotation frequency, latitude, and time.
 "Webcam Kirchhoff-Institut für Physik, Universität Heidelberg".
 California academy of sciences, CA  Foucault pendulum explanation, in friendly format
 Foucault pendulum model Exposition including a tabletop device that shows the Foucault effect in seconds.
 Foucault, M. L., Physical demonstration of the rotation of the Earth by means of the pendulum, Franklin Institute, 2000, retrieved 2007-10-31. Translation of his paper on Foucault pendulum.
 
 
 Pendolo nel Salone The Foucault Pendulum inside Palazzo della Ragione in Padova, Italy
  
 
 

 
 
 

Pendulums
Physics experiments
French inventions